Mudgee High School is a government-funded co-educational comprehensive secondary day school, located in Mudgee, a regional town in the Central West region of New South Wales, Australia. 

Established in 1916,  the school enrolled approximately 810 students in 2018, from Year 7 to Year 12, of whom 13 percent identified as Indigenous Australians and five percent were from a language background other than English. The school is operated by the NSW Department of Education; the principal is Wayne Eade.

Overview 
The school is undergoing several policy upgrades and changes. It has started implementing a new student welfare policy during 2013 that embraces Positive Behavior for Learning (PBL) with the three focus areas of Safe, Respectful, Responsible and are currently in the early stages of adopting a policy of Bring You Own Device (BYOD).

During the Building The Education Revolution (BER) the school gained a brand new Hospitality Trade Training Centre which has been named 'The Inner Quad Cafe' and a Metals and Engineering upgrade Trade Training Centre.

The school is part of the Cudgegong Learning Community (CLC).

Sports houses

At the beginning of Year 7, all Mudgee High School students are placed in one of the following four houses, usually on the basis of their last name.

Every year there is a swimming and athletic carnival held in which students compete to earn their house points. A winner of each carnival and of the overall house championship is announced each year.

Additionally, the houses are used to form the basis of roll call (free reading time), which students attend every morning for approx. 15 minutes.

School magazine 
Each year Mudgee High School produces a school magazine titled Mirri which showcases selections of the year's highlights.

Sister schools 
Mudgee High School has formed close links with several sister schools over the world including the Japanese Kitasenri High School, Nose Senior High School, and Ibaraki Nishi High School and, in East Timor, St. Francis of Assisi High School, in the town of Fatuberliu.

During 2014 a group of Mudgee High students and teachers made their way to Japan to further their study of the Japanese culture and language.

See also 

 List of government schools in New South Wales
 Education in Australia

Notable alumni
 Sir Ivan Noel Dougherty, Australian Army officer

References

External links
 Mudgee High School photos, 1939-71 at mudgeebusiness.com
 Mudgee High School photos, 1975-77 at mudgeebusiness.com

1916 establishments in Australia
Public high schools in New South Wales
Mudgee, New South Wales
Educational institutions established in 1916